Cheli is a Spanish-language juvenile sociolect or jargon diatopically restricted to the Madrid area, developed in the 1970s, primarily associated to the post-Francoist counterculture. It drew influence from the hampa and drug-dealing jargons, and it has been noted for Spanishizing Caló and English words as well as rescuing archaic Spanish-language words. Some popular Cheli words (such as privar, molar or vasca) were actually recorded already in the early 20th century in dictionaries of argot, even if frequently with different meanings.

Other phenomena related to the sociolect include the distortion of words, modified with -ata, -ota and -eta suffixes. While as a non-technical jargon, many, if not most, of its words have fallen into disuse as the language evolves, some of them have proven resilient enough to remain in the spoken language at the expense of more recent words.

See also

References
Citations

Bibliography
 
 
 
 
 
 

Culture in Madrid
Spanish dialects of Spain
City colloquials
Languages attested from the 1970s
1980s in Madrid
Youth culture